PPQ may refer to:

Partido Patria Querida (Beloved Fatherland Party), a political party in Paraguay
Parts per quadrillion
Pei language (ISO 639:ppq)
Plant Protection and Quarantine, a program of the USDA (United States Department of Agriculture)
Walther PPQ, semi-automatic pistol
Kapiti Coast Airport (IATA: PPQ), New Zealand
Pulses per quarter note, Music sequencing unit
Piperaquine, an anti-malarial drug

See also
 PPQA, process and product quality assurance